Mondor Glacier is a glacier  long flowing southwest from the head of Depot Glacier into Duse Bay, Trinity Peninsula, Antarctica. This glacier and Depot Glacier together fill the depression between Hope Bay and Duse Bay which marks the northern limit of Tabarin Peninsula. The glacier was mapped in 1946 and 1956 by the Falkland Islands Dependencies Survey (FIDS), who named the feature in association with Tabarin Peninsula. "Operation Tabarin" (the forerunner of FIDS) was derived from the "Bal Tabarin" in Paris. In Recueil General des Oeuvres et Fantaisies de Tabarin, Tabarin was the buffoon who attracted the crowd to the booth where Mondor sold his quack medicines.

See also
 List of glaciers in the Antarctic
 Glaciology

References

 

Glaciers of Trinity Peninsula